Mu Lati (Chinese: 穆 拉提, Pinyin: Mù Lā-tí; born 12 March 1964) is a Chinese former freestyle swimmer who competed in the 1984 Summer Olympics.

References

1964 births
Living people
Chinese male freestyle swimmers
Olympic swimmers of China
Swimmers at the 1984 Summer Olympics
Asian Games medalists in swimming
Swimmers at the 1986 Asian Games
Asian Games gold medalists for China
Medalists at the 1986 Asian Games
20th-century Chinese people